This is a list of bridges and other crossings of the Marikina River in Rizal and Metro Manila, Philippines.

The crossings are listed in order starting from its source at the tri-junction with the Boso Boso River and the Sapa Bute River and proceeding downstream at the Pasig River.

As of 2015, there are a total of sixteen bridge spans that cross the Marikina River, including one rail bridge, carrying the LRT Line 2 track.

Crossings

Planned crossings

References

Marikina
Crossings
Bridges in Metro Manila
Crossings
Crossings